The R615 road is a regional road in Ireland, located in County Cork and Cork City. It forms part of the Old Youghal Road.

References

Regional roads in the Republic of Ireland
Roads in County Cork